CeCe McDonald (born May 26, 1989) is an African American, bisexual, trans woman, and LGBTQ activist. She came to national attention in June 2012 for accepting a plea bargain of 41 months for second-degree manslaughter of a man she stabbed after McDonald and her friends were assaulted in Minneapolis outside a bar near closing time. The attack, a year prior, was widely seen as racist and transphobic, and became physical when McDonald was struck in the face by the man's friend with "an alcoholic drink" glass causing a bleeding gash that needed stitches.

According to Mother Jones, when McDonald was attempting to escape the bar, the man came after her. McDonald "took a pair of scissors out of her purse and turned around to face [him]; he was stabbed in the chest and died from the wound." McDonald said she saw how her case was progressing so took the plea bargain rather than face trial and risk a possible 20-year term. According to the Bay Area Reporter her conviction "sparked outrage, and was viewed by many as an act of transphobia and racism against a woman who defended herself." Although a woman, McDonald was housed in two men's prisons. An online petition "led to the state department of corrections administering the full regimen of hormones she needed."

Her story got international attention including in May 2013 when an Ebony.com article about the case won the GLAAD Media Award for "Outstanding Digital Journalism Article". She also received support from transgender activist and actress Laverne Cox, star of Orange Is the New Black, which includes story lines about trans women of color and hate crimes. Cox says McDonald is the image she has of her OITNB character, Sophia Burset, and that she plays Burset as an homage to McDonald. Cox also identifies with her experiences, "So many times I've ... been harassed, any of them could have escalated ... I very easily could be CeCe."

McDonald was released in January 2014 after serving 19 months. She was profiled in Rolling Stone among other publications and included as part of Advocate'''s annual "40 Under 40" list. FREE CeCe, a documentary about McDonald's experiences told through interviews by Laverne Cox, started production in December 2013. The film centers on the attack on McDonald and her friends including the stabbing, her imprisonment, and violence experienced by trans women of color. In August 2014 she was awarded the Bayard Rustin Civil Rights Award by the Harvey Milk LGBT Democratic Club.

Early life
McDonald, who was born in 1989 and is originally from South Chicago, studied fashion at Minneapolis Community and Technical College.

Assault

Background
At around 11:30 pm on June 5, 2011, McDonald, her roommate Latavia Taylor, and their friends Larry Tyaries Thomas, Zavawn Smith, and Roneal Harris, all of whom are African-American, walked the half-mile from McDonald and Taylor's apartment in Minneapolis to a Cub Foods to buy groceries. On the way, a police officer briefly stopped and questioned the group without provocation; he then followed them for a short time and departed.

Assault and attacks (June 2011)
McDonald said she and her friends were confronted outside the Schooner Tavern by Dean Schmitz and others. According to the charges against McDonald, this occurred shortly after midnight. Schmitz, his girlfriend Jenny Thoreson, and his ex-girlfriend Molly Flaherty had stepped out of the bar for a cigarette. McDonald said they shouted racist and transphobic slurs, while Thoreson, in interviews with police, characterized the remarks as derogatory and sarcastic. Thomas recalled Schmitz, Thoreson, and Flaherty saying "oh you faggots, you nigger lovers, and whoop-de-woo, you ain't nothing but a bunch of nigger babies," and that in response he went over to talk to Schmitz. According to Thomas, Schmitz then walked off and "started talking this stuff, like, 'Oh, look at the tranny over there, look at that tranny. McDonald said in a letter from Hennepin County jail that Schmitz called everyone in McDonald's group niggers.

McDonald testified that she and her friends tried to walk away, but that Flaherty started a fight by smashing a glass of alcohol against her face, cutting her and requiring 11 stitches. McDonald was asked in court whether Flaherty then said "I can take on all of you bitches", to which she replied in the affirmative; Thoreson recalled that at this point Flaherty threw the first punch. According to McDonald's testimony, at one point Schmitz said "look at that boy dressed like a girl and tucking her dick in". David Crandell, Flaherty's boyfriend, then stepped out of the bar to find multiple members of McDonald's group attacking Flaherty, and tried to pull them away from her.

Gary Gilbert, a security worker at the Schooner Tavern, recalled seeing Schmitz pull McDonald away from Flaherty, and that Schmitz and McDonald then moved into the street. McDonald's defense characterized this move as McDonald having "attempted to leave the scene, attempted to get out of harm's way", and added that she was followed by Schmitz. Gilbert recalled that McDonald appeared to be holding a blade, while Schmitz had his fists clenched and said to McDonald "you gonna stab me, you bitch?" Schmitz then hunched over, put his hand to his shirt and said "you stabbed me," to which McDonald replied, according to a witness, "Yes I did." Schmitz was stabbed in the chest with a pair of scissors. McDonald told police that Schmitz charged at her, running into scissors she was holding.

After those present saw Schmitz bleeding, the fighting stopped; McDonald and Thomas ran towards Cub Foods while some of their friends boarded a Metro Transit bus. Schmitz's wound was more than three inches deep and pierced his heart in the right ventricle. Anthony Stoneburg, who was in the neighborhood visiting his aunt, tried to plug the wound, but Schmitz died in the ambulance. In the parking lot of the grocery store, McDonald saw the police car searching for her and flagged the officers down. She was arrested and confessed to the stabbing, but in her letter from Hennepin County jail wrote that confessing was "a big mistake [for] trying to cover up for one of my friends who actually did it. I didn't know exactly who, but I knew someone was defending me." Larry Thomas and Zavawn Smith also said that another friend, who they saw running away from the scene at the time, had admitted stabbing Schmitz.

Pretrial period
In the days following the stabbing, the office of Hennepin County Attorney Michael Freeman reviewed evidence including a taped confession from McDonald before charging her with two counts of second-degree murder. McDonald's case was picked up by Hersch Izek of the Legal Rights Center, a nonprofit organization offering legal representation and help for its clients. Izek did not dispute that McDonald stabbed Schmitz in the heart or that the wound was responsible for Schmitz's death; however he argued that McDonald acted in self-defense and was not to blame for Schmitz's death: "she stabbed him, but her actions were reasonable when confronted with the reasonable possibility of bodily harm or death to herself. That's what the jury instruction calls for in this kind of case." Izek cited the fact that McDonald was bleeding profusely from her facial wound as a reason for her to believe she was in danger. Freeman argued there was no evidence that Schmitz posed a threat to McDonald's life and that McDonald had failed to exercise her duty to retreat, saying "the evidence here does not reflect self-defense. She stepped forward to thrust a weapon into a person that had not assaulted her. That, to me, just doesn't fit." Freeman also said "there is no evidence that I'm aware of that [Schmitz] had any weapon in his hand, or that he had done anything to McDonald, other than to be part of this group, where there were shouts from virtually everyone around." Freeman also alleged that McDonald's story changed between the incident and her trial: though on the night of June 5 she confessed to stabbing Schmitz, she later claimed someone else had stabbed him.

The defense also intended to bring before the jury details about Schmitz, including that he had faced more than two dozen criminal cases since turning 18; his past convictions for fifth-degree assault and domestic assault; that methamphetamine and benzoylecgonine (a cocaine metabolite), which when combined can lead to unpredictable and unwarranted violence, were found in his system; and that he had a tattoo of a swastika on his chest. Schmitz's brother said Schmitz was not a racist, but that he had become a part of a group of white supremacists while in prison when he was younger. Freeman dismissed the tattoo as irrelevant, saying McDonald "couldn't see it, nor could anyone else ... It adds a little bit of sensationalism to the case, obviously."

On the first day of pretrial hearings, the prosecution disputed the admittance of Schmitz's tattoo, arguing it was not relevant and was unfairly prejudicial. Judge Daniel Moreno ruled that Schmitz's tattoo and his three previous convictions for assault were not admissible as evidence of his alleged violent disposition, that McDonald's supporters could not wear "Free CeCe" T-shirts in court, and that the defense's toxicology expert could testify to the effects of methamphetamine and benzoylecgonine in general but not their effects on Schmitz on the night in question. Moreno also prevented experts from testifying about the atmosphere of transphobia and how it might have made McDonald fear for her life. Moreno also permitted the admittance of McDonald's prior statements on blogs and Facebook and a motion to impeach McDonald's testimony due to her previous conviction for writing a bad check.

Media and public attention during pre-trial
In the aftermath of the stabbing, Schmitz's family spoke to FOX 9 News. Schmitz's son, Jeremy Williams, said his father "always used to go out of his way to help people... He would give the shirt off his back to help people. He was, overall, a great person." In her letter from Hennepin County jail, McDonald said "none of this mess wouldn't be happening if it weren't for the victim and his group being rude and disrespectful to people they never knew."

In April 2012, author Kate Bornstein spoke about McDonald on MSNBC cable television program Melissa Harris-Perry, comparing McDonald's situation with George Zimmerman's in the aftermath of the killing of Trayvon Martin regarding self-defense issues and how the case is viewed through the media focus. The case also attracted national attention from LGBT activists including author Leslie Feinberg, who wrote that "the right of self-defense against all forms of oppressions—the spirit of Stonewall—is at the heart of the demand to free [McDonald]". Cam Gordon, a member of the Minneapolis City Council, announced his support for McDonald and called the incident "another example [of] transgender women of color being targeted for hate- and bias-related violence", and Susan Allen, a member of the Minnesota House of Representatives, called on Freeman to consider the "extenuating circumstances" of McDonald's case. In May 2013, an article by Marc Lamont Hill for Ebony.com entitled "Why Aren't We Fighting for CeCe McDonald?" won the GLAAD Media Award for "Outstanding Digital Journalism Article". McDonald also received the support of transgender activist and actress Laverne Cox, who stars in the television series Orange Is the New Black.

A May 2012 press release by McDonald's support committee said the sentencing proceedings included statements from community leaders, clergy, and members of McDonald's family. McDonald's supporters held dance parties and rallies outside the Hennepin County jail in her honor, and over 18,000 people signed a Change.org petition calling for Freeman to drop the charges against McDonald.

In June 2012, a group calling itself the "Queer Attack Squadron" claimed responsibility for a Portland, Oregon incident throwing an unlit molotov cocktail through the window of a Wells Fargo bank as a gesture of solidarity with McDonald. Katie Burgess, executive director of the Trans Youth Support Network, said the group had no connection to McDonald's supporters in Minneapolis. Burgess said the growth in support for McDonald and her self-defense argument was due to the perception McDonald was "on trial for surviving a hate crime."

Plea bargain (May 2012)
Days before the trial was to begin, Moreno offered a plea bargain under which McDonald's charges of second-degree murder would be reduced to second-degree manslaughter, and under which she would have to admit only to criminal negligence rather than murder. On May 2, 2012, the defense and prosecution agreed on a 41-month sentence, the minimum sentence for second-degree manslaughter, as a compromise. In accepting the plea deal, McDonald had to relinquish her argument that she killed Schmitz in self-defense or by accident, and had to forego a trial by jury. McDonald said she accepted the plea deal for her loved ones: instead of risking decades in prison, the deal was expected to result in her being freed in a fraction of the time. On June 4, 2012, Moreno sentenced McDonald to 41 months in prison. At her sentencing hearing McDonald told the court "I'm sure that to Dean's family, he was a loving, caring person, but that is not what I saw that night. I saw a racist, transphobic, narcissistic bigot who did not have any regard for my friends and I." McDonald was given credit for 245 days' jail time, and required to pay $6,410 in restitution for Schmitz's funeral expenses.

Imprisonment
While awaiting trial, McDonald was held in segregated custody and spent time under house arrest. In May 2012, Michael Friedman of the Legal Rights Center said there was "no way" McDonald would be "sent to a women's prison." Burgess said "People tend to think about how CeCe identifies as a woman and say she should be able to go to a women's facility ... But there's really no history of transgender people being placed according to their gender identity. So once CeCe is placed in a permanent facility, she'll look around and decide if she feels safe there. If she doesn't, she'll move forward with a civil suit against the Department of Corrections to be relocated to a safer place. That may or may not be a women's prison." After she was sentenced, McDonald expressed resignation, saying "I've faced worse things in my life than prison."

Following her conviction, a spokeswoman for the Minnesota Department of Corrections said officials had decided to place McDonald in the Minnesota Correctional Facility – St. Cloud, an adult male facility, though her final destination had yet to be determined; and that the state would make its own determination of McDonald's gender. The state's gender assessment concluded that McDonald would be held in a men's facility. During her imprisonment a petition caused the Department of Corrections to administer the correct regimen of hormones. Despite being transferred to a second facility McDonald remained quartered with men throughout her imprisonment.

Flaherty assault case
Flaherty, Schmitz's ex-girlfriend who was among those verbally assaulting McDonald and her friends outside the bar, was charged in May 2012 with second-degree assault with a deadly weapon and third-degree assault causing substantial bodily harm for attacking McDonald with "an alcoholic drink" glass causing a bleeding gash to her face needing eleven stitches. Her case was referred to the Washington County Attorney's Office in order to avoid a conflict of interest. In April 2013, Flaherty was sentenced to six months' jail time and probation after pleading guilty to third-degree assault, and was given credit for 135 days served in jail.

Release (January 2014)
McDonald was released on January 13, 2014, after serving 19 months, and remained under the supervision of the Minnesota Department of Corrections through her 41-month sentence. Laverne Cox was among those who greeted her. Roxanne Anderson, the program director for the Trans Youth Support Network, said "CeCe is doing great. She looks good and she is good spirits," and that McDonald was not ready to comment publicly. Chase Strangio, a staff attorney for the American Civil Liberties Union, said "This is a day to celebrate, and to honor CeCe for all she's done from the day of her arrest to draw attention to the systemic violence women of color, and particularly LGBT women of color face everyday. Her message from the start was not to sensationalize the story, but to bring attention to the issue."

McDonald gave her first televised interview six days later on Melissa Harris-Perry on MSNBC. McDonald spoke about her incarceration and those of other incarcerated transgender people, saying "I felt like they wanted me to hate myself as a trans woman," and added "prisons aren't safe for anyone, and that's the key issue." The segment also featured Katie Burgess, who said "the only way that trans folks are going to be safe in prisons is for incarceration of people to end."

Post-incarceration

In 2014, McDonald was profiled by the Rolling Stone and included as part of the Advocate's annual "40 Under 40" list. In August 2014 she was awarded the Bayard Rustin Civil Rights Award by the Harvey Milk LGBT Democratic Club.

In 2016, McDonald teamed up with gender non-conforming activist and prison abolitionist Joshua Allen for a Black Excellence Tour.

FREE CeCe!FREE CeCe, a documentary about McDonald by Laverne Cox and Jac Gares, started production in August 2013. The film is told through an interview with McDonald conducted by Cox, and deals with the events in 2011, McDonald's imprisonment and violence experienced by trans women of color. FREE CeCe was the kick-off film at the 2016 San Francisco Transgender Film Festival, the world's first and longest-running transgender film festival. Jac Gares, a New York City filmmaker, directed the film with Cox as executive producer. Gares had previously produced the LGBT PBS series In The Life and raised $300,000 to fund FREE CeCe''.

See also

 History of violence against LGBT people in the United States
 LGBT people in prison
 Significant acts of violence against LGBT people
 Trans bashing
 Violence against LGBT people

References

External links

 Free CeCe official website
 

1989 births
Living people
People from Chicago
People from Minneapolis
American LGBT rights activists
LGBT African Americans
African-American activists
Transgender women
Bisexual rights activists
Bisexual women
Prisoners and detainees of Minnesota
LGBT people from Minnesota
American people convicted of manslaughter
American victims of anti-LGBT hate crimes
Violence against trans women
Transgender law in the United States
Criminals from Illinois
21st-century American criminals
21st-century American women
Women civil rights activists
21st-century African-American women
20th-century African-American people
21st-century LGBT people
20th-century African-American women
Women in Minnesota